Acrocercops castellata is a moth of the family Gracillariidae, known from Sri Lanka. It was described by E. Meyrick in 1908.

References

castellata
Moths of Asia
Moths described in 1908